Numerous castles are found in the German states of Berlin and Brandenburg. These buildings, some of which have a history of over 1000 years, were the setting of historical events, domains of famous personalities and are still imposing buildings to this day.

This list encompasses castles described in German as Castle (castle), Festung (fort/fortress), Palace (manor house) and Palace/Palast (palace). Many German castles after the middle ages were mainly built as royal or ducal palaces rather than as a fortified building.

Berlin 

Charlottenburg Palace, Charlottenburg
Bellevue Palace, Tiergarten
Stadtschloss, Mitte
Schönhausen Palace, Pankow
Palace auf der Pfaueninsel, Wannsee
Biesdorf Palace, Biesdorf
Britz House, Britz
Jagdschloss Grunewald, Grunewald
Palacehotel Grunewald, Grunewald
Glienicke Hunting Lodge, Wannsee
Glienicke Palace, Wannsee
Crown Prince's Palace, Mitte
Palace of Prince Henry, today Humboldt University, Mitte
Donner Palace, today Palace am Festungsgraben, Mitte
Mendelssohn Palace, Grunewald
Princesses' Palace, Mitte
Tegel Palace, Tegel
Köpenick Palace, Köpenick
Friedrichsfelde Palace, Friedrichsfelde
Monbijou Palace (destroyed), Mitte
Gutshaus Steglitz ("Wrangelschlösschen"), Steglitz
Spandau Citadel, Haselhorst
Palais am Festungsgraben
Fort Hahneberg, Staaken

Brandenburg

Brandenburg an der Havel 
 Plaue an der Havel Palace

Cottbus 
 Branitz Palace

Potsdam 

 Babelsberg Palace, Babelsberg Park
 Cecilienhof Palace, New Garden
 Marble Palace, New Garden
 Marquardt Palace
 Little Palace in Babelsberg Park
 Stadtschloss
 New Palace, Sanssouci Park
 Sacrow Palace
 Kartzow Palace
 Sanssouci Palace, Sanssouci Park
 New Chambers, Sanssouci Park
 Orangery Palace, Sanssouci Park
 Satzkorn Manor House
 Charlottenhof Palace, Sanssouci Park
 Lindstedt Palace
 Stern Hunting Lodge
 Lichtenau Palace, at New Garden

Barnim District 
 Bärenkasten, Oderberg

Dahme-Spreewald District 
 Wasserschloss Fürstlich Drehna, Luckau
 Königs Wusterhausen Palace, Königs Wusterhausen
 Lustschloss Zeesen, Zeesen

Elbe-Elster District 
 Ahlsdorf Palace, Ahlsdorf near Schönewalde
 Doberlug Palace, Doberlug-Kirchhain
 Elsterwerda Palace, Elsterwerda
 Finsterwalde Palace, Finsterwalde
 Grochwitz Palace, Herzberg (Elster)
 Lebusa Palace, Lebusa
 Liebenwerda Palace (partly preserved), Bad Liebenwerda
 Martinskirchen Palace, Martinskirchen
 Mühlberg Palace, Mühlberg/Elbe
 Neudeck/Elster Palace, Neudeck near Uebigau-Wahrenbrück
 Sallgast Palace, Sallgast
 Saathain Palace (destroyed), Saathain
 Schlieben Palace (destroyed), Schlieben
 Sonnewalde Palace, Sonnewalde
 Stechau Palace, Stechau, municipality Fichtwald
 Uebigau Palace, Uebigau-Wahrenbrück
 Wahrenbrück Castle (destroyed), Uebigau-Wahrenbrück
 Würdenhain Palace (destroyed), Würdenhain

Havelland District 

 Friesack Castle, Friesack
 Paretz Palace, Ketzin

Märkisch-Oderland District 
 Altranft Palace, Altranft
 Gusow Palace, Gusow-Platkow
 Neuhardenberg Palace, Neuhardenberg
 Prötzel Palace, Prötzel

Oberhavel District 
 Meseberg Palace, Gransee
 Vehlefanz Castle, Oberkrämer
 Oranienburg Palace, Oranienburg
 Liebenberg Palace, Löwenberger Land
 Hoppenrade Palace, Löwenberger Land
 Fürstenberg Palace, Fürstenberg/Havel
 Dahmshöhe Palace, Fürstenberg/Havel

Oder-Spree District 
 Beeskow Castle, Beeskow
 Friedland Castle, Friedland
 Storkow Castle, Storkow (Mark)
 Steinhöfel Palace, Steinhöfel
 Fürstenwalde Palace (bishop’s  residence), Fürstenwalde
 Jagdschloss Fürstenwalde, Fürstenwalde

Ostprignitz-Ruppin District 

 Alte Bischofsburg, Wittstock / Dosse
 Daberburg, Wittstock / Dosse
 Garz Castle (Temnitztal), Garz
 Goldbeck Castle, Goldbeck
 Rheinsberg Palace, Rheinsberg
 Wildberg Castle, Wildberg

Potsdam-Mittelmark District 
 Caputh Palace, Schwielowsee
 Eisenhardt Castle, Belzig
 Petzow Palace, Schwielowsee
 Rabenstein Castle, Rabenstein / Fläming
 Reckahn Palace, Kloster Lehnin
 Wiesenburg Palace, Wiesenburg / Mark
 Ziesar Castle, Ziesar

Prignitz District 
 Demerthin Palace, Gumtow
 Gänseburg, Putlitz
 Philipshof Palace, Putlitz
 Plattenburg, Plattenburg
 Palace Wolfshagen, Groß Pankow (Prignitz)

Teltow-Fläming District 
 Blankensee House (former manor house), Trebbin
 Wiepersdorf Palace, Niederer Fläming

Uckermark District 

 Blankenburg Castle, Uckerland
 Boitzenburg Palace, Boitzenburger Land
 Gerswalde Castle, Gerswalde
 Greiffenberg Castle, Angermünde
 Schwedt Palace (destroyed), Schwedt
 Castle Stolpe (Grützpott), Angermünde
 Wartin Castle (Uckermark), Uckerland
 Zichow Castle, Zichow

See also 
List of castles
List of castles in Germany

 
 
Castles
Castles
Berlin and Brandenburg